Alona Pushkarevsky (born 28 January 1997 in Haifa) is an Israeli tennis player.

Playing for Israel at the Fed Cup, Pushkarevsky has a win–loss record of 0–4.

She had a knee surgery in the end of June 2016.

She won 2 ITF 10k tournaments with Ofri Lankri during 2015.

ITF Finals

Doubles (2–3)

References

External links 
 
 
 

1997 births
Living people
People from Haifa
Israeli female tennis players
Israeli people of Ukrainian descent
21st-century Israeli women